Dumfries railway station serves the town of Dumfries in Dumfries and Galloway, Scotland. It is located on the Glasgow South Western Line. The station is owned by Network Rail and managed by ScotRail who provide all passenger train services. It is staffed on a part-time basis throughout the week.

History 
Opened by the Glasgow, Dumfries and Carlisle Railway in 1848, the line serving it was extended northwards to Kilmarnock and Glasgow two years later (the GD&CR became part of the Glasgow and South Western Railway at the same time). It subsequently became the junction for branches to Castle Douglas and Stranraer (opened between 1859 and 1861),  (opened in 1863 and taken over in 1865 by the Caledonian Railway) and latterly to Moniaive (Cairn Valley Railway, opened in 1905). All of these later lines have now closed (the Port Road to Stranraer being the last to go in June 1965), leaving only the original G&SWR main line open to serve the town.  The Beeching Axe cutting the Castle Douglas and Dumfries Railway and Portpatrick and Wigtownshire Railway has resulted in adverse mileage to connect Stranraer with a longer line via Kilmarnock and Ayr. The journey by railway and ferry via Stranraer to Larne Harbour or since the line closed to the Port of Belfast is much longer.

Historic Scotland have designated the station and separately the adjacent station hotel as category B listed buildings.

Carnation built an evaporated milk factory in Dumfries that opened in 1935, eventually constructing three units producing tin cans, evaporated milk and latterly Coffeemate. The original factory had private siding access to the station's goods yard, which gave access for milk trains to the facility, in both delivering raw product as well as distribution to London. Milk trains stopped in the mid-1970s. The United States parent company was bought by Nestle in 1985, after which a decline in the facility began. CoffeeMate production ceased in 2000, after which the site was fully redeveloped as an industrial estate.

In fiction
The station features in the novel The Thirty-Nine Steps (1915) by John Buchan. Richard Hannay, fleeing from German secret agents, travels from London St Pancras to Galloway, changing trains at Dumfries. In 1939, T.S. Eliot included Dumfries in his Old Possum's Book of Practical Cats. Skimbleshanks, the Railway Cat, speaks with the police at Dumfries Station during the night.

Services

ScotRail
The service from the station is somewhat infrequent with trains running to different patterns during the day, these are as follows:

In the December 2021 timetable, There is an uneven hourly to 2 hourly service southbound to Carlisle and there are 9 trains per day northbound to Kilmarnock and Glasgow Central (these operate to a mostly 2 hourly frequency but there can be uneven gaps of up to 4 hours at certain points of the day). On Sundays, There is a 2 hourly service to/from Carlisle (5 trains per day in total) and 2 trains per day northbound to Glasgow. Extra trains run at peak times to both Carlisle and Glasgow.

Services running through Carlisle to Newcastle were stopped at the May 2022 timetable change.

Gallery

1960

2009

References

Notes

Sources

External links 
 RailScot - Glasgow, Dumfries & Carlisle Railway
 Video of the Dumfries Incredible Edible Group's station gardens project.
 Video footage and history of Dumfries railway station.

Railway stations in Dumfries and Galloway
Former Glasgow and South Western Railway stations
Railway stations in Great Britain opened in 1848
Railway stations served by ScotRail
Listed railway stations in Scotland
Category B listed buildings in Dumfries and Galloway
Buildings and structures in Dumfries
1848 establishments in Scotland